Cihangir Ghaffari (born 9 September 1940) is an Iranian actor and film producer, known for Les démons (1973), Dick Turpin (1974) and Bloodsport (1988).

Career
Ghaffari starred in a large number of Turkish film productions mainly in the 1970s. His popularity in the cinema of that country led him to integrate the cast of international productions, such as Shaft vuelve a Harlem (1972) by Gordon Parks, Los demonios (1973) Jesús Franco, El monte de las brujas (1974) by Raúl Artigot, Dick Turpin (1974) by Fernando Merino, Hundra (1983) by Matt Cimber, Ciudad del crimen (1984) by Abel Ferrara and Bloodsport (1988) by Newt Arnold.

He also served as a producer on titles such as Hundra (1983), Yellow Hair and the Fortress of Gold (1984) and La cruz de Iberia (1990). In 1975 he had a small appearance on the American television series Medical Center. In the early 1990s, Ghaffari retired from the film scene.

Filmography

References

Sources

External links

Living people
1940 births
Iranian male film actors
Iranian film producers
Iranian emigrants to the United States
Iranian emigrants to Spain
Iranian expatriates in Turkey
Iranian Azerbaijanis